Charles Clapp may refer to:

 Charles Clapp (rower) (born 1959), American rower
 Charles Clapp (judge) (1923–2004), judge of the United States Tax Court